Thomas O'Connell may refer to:

Thomas O'Connell (Medal of Honor) (1842–1899), American Civil War sailor
Thomas J. O'Connell (1882–1969), Irish Labour party politician, leader of the party 1927–1932
Thomas W. O'Connell, Assistant Secretary of Defense for Special Operations/Low Intensity Conflict & Interdependent Capabilities
Tommy O'Connell (1930–2014), American football player and coach
Tommy O'Connell (Kilkenny hurler) (1939–2019), Irish hurler
 Tommy O'Connell (Cork hurler) (born 2000), Irish hurler
Tom O'Connell (television personality) (born 1990), contestant on Big Brother UK
Tom O'Connell (cricketer) (born 2000), Australian cricketer